The Dead Rabbits was the name of an Irish American criminal street gang active in Lower Manhattan in the 1830s to 1850s. The Dead Rabbits were so named after a dead rabbit was thrown into the center of the room during a gang meeting, prompting some members to treat this as an omen, withdraw, and form an independent gang. Their battle symbol was a dead rabbit on a pike. They often clashed with Nativist political groups who viewed Irish Catholics as a threatening and criminal subculture. The Dead Rabbits were given the nicknames of "Mulberry Boys" and the "Mulberry Street Boys" by the New York City Police Department because they were known to have operated along Mulberry Street in the Five Points.

History

The original Dead Rabbits were founded by disgruntled gang members of the Roach Guards, who became the largest Irish crime organization in early 19th-century Manhattan, having well over 100 members when called up for action. Their chief rival gang was the Bowery Boys, native-born New Yorkers who supported the Know Nothing anti-immigrant political party.

These two rival gangs fought more than 200 gang battles in a span of 10 years, beginning in 1834, and they often outmanned the police force and even the state militias. They were also in the forefront of the Dead Rabbits Riot of 1857, and may have participated in the 1863 New York Draft Riots in the American Civil War. Besides street-fighting, the Dead Rabbits supported politicians such as Fernando Wood and the Tammany Hall machine, whose platforms included the welfare and benefit of immigrant groups and minorities, and under the leadership of Isaiah Rynders the gang acted as enforcers to violently persuade voters during elections to vote for their candidates. According to legend, one of the most feared Dead Rabbits was "Hell-Cat Maggie", a woman who reportedly filed her teeth to points and wore brass fingernails into battle.

New York's Democrats were divided into two camps: those who supported Mayor Fernando Wood and those who opposed him. The Bowery gangs were among the latter, while the Dead Rabbits were supporters of Wood. Thus, the Bowery Boys threw their support in league with state Republicans, who proposed legislation that would strip Wood of certain powers and place them in the hands of Albany. One of these proposals was to disband the Municipal Police Department, in which Wood's supporters had a controlling interest, and replace it with a state-run Metropolitan Police Department. Wood refused to disband his Municipal Department, and so for the first half of 1857, the two rival departments battled it out on the streets of the city until the courts ordered the Municipals to disband that July. On July 4, a riot occurred between the Dead Rabbits and the Metropolitan Police, and the Bowery gangs against the Municipal Police, Mulberry Street Boys, Roach Guards, and Dead Rabbits in Bayard Street.

There was a similar gang in Liverpool, England, in the late 19th century, which mobilized as a militia in times of crisis.

By 1866, mentions of the Dead Rabbits as an organization currently in existence disappeared from New York City newspapers, and they were sometimes referred to in the past tense. The term "Dead Rabbit" was used as late as the 1880s as a generic term for a young, lower class criminal.

Song

Lyrics detailing the Dead Rabbits' battle with the Bowery Boys on July 4, 1857, were written by Henry Sherman Backus and Daniel Decatur Emmett:
Chorus 
Then pull off the coat and roll up the sleeve,
For Bayard is a hard street to travel;
So pull off the coat and roll up the sleeve,
The Bloody Sixth is a hard ward to travel I believe.

Like wild dogs they did fight, this Fourth of July night,
Of course they laid their plans accordin';
Some were wounded and some killed, and lots of blood spill'd,
In the fight on the other side of Jordan.

Chorus 
The new Police did join the Bowery boys in line,
With orders strict and right accordin;
Bullets, clubs and bricks did fly, and many groan and die,
Hard road to travel over Jordan.

Chorus 
When the new police did interfere, this made the Rabbits sneer,
And very much enraged them accordin';
With bricks they did go in, determined for to win,
And drive them on the other side of Jordan.

Chorus 
Upon the following day they had another fray,
The Black Birds and Dead Rabbits accordin;
The soldiers were call'd out, to quell the mighty riot,
And drove them on the other side of Jordan.

In popular culture

In films and television
The Dead Rabbit Riot was featured in the History Channel documentary television series History's Mysteries in 1998.
The story of the New York Dead Rabbits is told, in highly fictionalized form, in Martin Scorsese's 2002 film Gangs of New York, which was partially inspired by Herbert Asbury's book Gangs of New York. In the 2014 film, Winter's Tale, the Dead Rabbits and the Short Tails are featured prominently; a similar theme pervades Mark Helprin 1983 novel of the same name.
The fourth season of the 2014 television series, Hell on Wheels has a few Dead Rabbit characters.

In literature
A book of poetry by Richard Griffin, The Dead Rabbit Riot, A.D. 1857: And Other Poems, was published in 1915.
Patricia Beatty's 1987 historical children's fiction novel Charlie Skedaddle mentions Dead Rabbits (the main character is a Bowery Boy).

Some of the exploits of the Dead Rabbits are dramatized in Chapter XVIII of MacKinlay Kantor's Pulitzer Prize-winning novel Andersonville (1955).

In art
Artist George Henry Hall's 1858 painting is titled A Dead Rabbit (also entitled Study of the Nude or Study of an Irishman), which depicts a dead Dead Rabbit gang member killed during the riot on July 4, 1857, in New York City's Lower East Side.

See also
Dead Rabbits riot
Gangs of New York
Hell-Cat Maggie
John Morrissey

References

Sources
 Asbury, Herbert. The Gangs of New York. New York: Alfred A. Knopf, 1928; 
 Sifakis, Carl. The Encyclopedia of American Crime. New York: Facts on File Inc., 2001;

External links

19th-century American criminals
Irish-American gangs
Former gangs in New York City
Irish-American culture in New York (state)
Five Points, Manhattan
Irish-American history
19th century in New York City